The 1977 Australian federal election was held in Australia on 10 December 1977. All 124 seats in the House of Representatives and 34 of the 64 seats in the Senate were up for election.

The incumbent Liberal-National Country Coalition led by Malcolm Fraser, in government since 1975, was elected to a second term over the opposition Labor Party led by Gough Whitlam. While the Coalition suffered a five-seat swing, it still had a substantial 48-seat majority in the House. The Liberals retained an outright majority, with 67 seats. Although Fraser thus had no need for the support of the National Country Party, the Coalition was retained.

Whitlam became the first and only person to contest four federal elections as Leader of the Opposition. He was unable to recover much of the ground Labor had lost in its severe defeat two years prior, and resigned as leader shortly after the election.

Background and issues

The government offering tax cuts to voters and ran advertisements with the slogan "fistful of dollars". The tax cuts were never delivered; instead a "temporary surcharge" was imposed in 1978. The election coincided with the retirement of the Governor-General, Sir John Kerr. Kerr had appeared drunk at the Melbourne Cup in November and the public outcry resulted in the cancellation of his appointment as Ambassador to UNESCO.

The 1977 election was held a year earlier than required, partly to bring elections for the House and Senate back into line. A half-Senate election had to be held by July 1978, since the double dissolution election of 1975 had resulted in the terms of senators being backdated to 1 July 1975, as per Section 13 of the Constitution of Australia.

Results

House of Representatives results

Senate results

 Independent: Brian Harradine (Tasmania)
 The Progress Party was the renamed "Workers Party" from the 1975 election.

Seats changing hands

 Members listed in italics did not contest their seat at this election.

Significance
This election marks the effective parliamentary debut of the Australian Democrats. The former Liberal minister Don Chipp had resigned his seat to leave politics but was soon invited to lead the new party and decided to run as a senator for Victoria. The party's Janine Haines had briefly inherited a South Australian Senate seat when Liberal Movement senator Steele Hall had resigned to contest a lower-house seat. Haines was, however, not preselected to recontest the seat. Don Chipp was elected in Victoria and Colin Mason in New South Wales. (Haines returned to the Senate at the following election.)

The second Fraser Government had the second-largest parliamentary majority in Australian history (at the time) after the majority it won in the 1975 election. Gough Whitlam resigned as the leader of the ALP in 1978, and was replaced by Bill Hayden.

This was the last Australian federal election for the House of Representatives at which no women were elected, although there were a number of women candidates. Women have been elected at every federal election from 1980 onwards.

See also
 Candidates of the Australian federal election, 1977
 Members of the Australian House of Representatives, 1977–1980
 Members of the Australian Senate, 1978–1981

Notes

References

AustralianPolitics.com election details
University of WA  election results in Australia since 1890
AEC 2PP vote

1977 elections in Australia
Federal elections in Australia
Gough Whitlam
Malcolm Fraser
December 1977 events in Australia
Landslide victories